Dead to Rights: Reckoning is a third-person shooter video game developed by Rebellion Developments and published by Namco. It was released for PlayStation Portable on June 28, 2005 in North America and February 3, 2006 in Europe, and is the third installment of the Dead to Rights series. It is a prequel to Dead to Rights II.

Plot 
Grant City police officer Jack Slate and his K-9 companion must rescue the daughter of a Grant City Senator.

Gameplay 
The gameplay of Dead to Rights: Reckoning is very similar to Dead to Rights II and retains the series' signature usage of bullet time, disarming moves and the ability to use Shadow as an attack dog. Similar to Dead to Rights II, this games does not contain minigames.

Reception 

Dead to Rights: Reckoning received "mixed" reviews according to video game review aggregator Metacritic.

References

External links 
 

2005 video games
PlayStation Portable games
Rebellion Developments games
Namco games
Third-person shooters
Video games about police officers
Video games developed in the United Kingdom
PlayStation Portable-only games
Video game prequels
Video game spin-offs
Multiplayer and single-player video games